The  is an archaeological site containing the ruins of the Nara to early Heian period government administrative complex for Ina District , Shinano Province, located in what is now part of the town of Iida, Nagano in the Chūbu region of Japan. The ruins were designated a National Historic Site of Japan in 2014, with the area under protection extended in 2016.

Overview
An administrative complex, or Kanga (官衙) was constructed for each gun with a tax warehouse complex, per a common template.

The Gonga Kanga ruins is located in the southern end of Ina Valley at the southern tip of modern Nagano Prefecture at an elevation of 320 to 430 meters. An archaeological excavation of the ruins began in 1974 by the Iida City Board of Education noted that the layout of the ruins was that of a typical district office during the Nara period, and further excavation surveys confirmed the extent of the ruins from 1986 to 1984. 

The site dates from latter half of the 7th century and appears to have been in use through the early 10th century. It was a trapezoidal enclosure measuring 215 meters on its long side by 150 meters on its short side. The enclosure was not square, as was typical with similar complexes in other locations, as it was built next to an earlier keyhole-shaped kofun tumulus, which was not included within its borders. Inside the enclosure, the foundations of a granary complex for the storage of tax rice, an administrative building with an attached kitchen, and the remnants of a moat were discovered. The complex was destroyed and rebuilt several times through the Heian period.  In the center of the complex was a pond fed by a natural spring, from which a large number of wooden artifacts were recovered. These included wooden tag markers, roof tiles, belt decorations, a large number of pottery shards, and numerous wadōkaichin coins, as well as objects which were clearly of some ritual significance. 

The site is a two minutes walk from Motozenkoji Station on the JR East  Iida Line.

See also
List of Historic Sites of Japan (Nagano)

References

External links
Iida city official site 

Nara period
7th-century establishments in Japan
History of Nagano Prefecture
Iida, Nagano
Historic Sites of Japan
Archaeological sites in Japan
Shinano Province